Gabi or GABI may refer to:

People
 Gabi (footballer, born 1981) or Gabriel José Pinto Couto, Portuguese footballer
 Gabi (footballer, born 1983) or Gabriel Fernández Arenas, Spanish footballer
 Gabi Ashkenazi (born 1954), Israeli general and politician
 Gabi DeMartino (born 1995), American singer-songwriter
 Gabriela Guimarães (born 1994), Brazilian volleyball player
 Gabi Hun (born 1990), American rock musician
 Gabi Neumark (1946–2000), Israeli basketball player
 Gabriel Popescu (born 1973), former Romanian footballer
 Gabi Teichner (born 1945), Israeli basketball player

Places
 Gabi, Bohol, a barangay in Ubay, Bohol, Philippines
 Gabi, Niger
 A barangay in Cordova, Cebu, Philippines
 Mount Gabi, an underwater mountain near the southwestern tip of Western Australia

Other uses
 Gabi (clothing), a blanket made of chiffon used in Ethiopia
 Gabi (dog)
 Gabi (elephant)
 Gabi (film), a 2012 film
 Gabi-Gabi language, a language of Queensland, Australia
 Great American Biotic Interchange (GABI), a paleozoographic event resulting from the formation of the Isthmus of Panama
 A term for Taro in the Philippines

See also
 
 Gabii, in Latium, Italy